Firyal Al Adhamy Al-Adhamy (born 1950 in Baghdad, Iraq) is a Bahrain-based British Iraqi artist.

Life and career
Born in Baghdad in 1950, she began her artistic endeavours as a hobby, crafting  jewellery, costumes, textiles and woodwork, all inspired by Iraq's ancient cultural history. Later, when some of her jewellery was acquired by museums, she began to see her work as a potential career.

Although she graduated from the University of Baghdad, she did not study arts and is a self-taught artist.

Her aim is to faithfully reproduce ancient objects, thereby preserving Iraq's heritage. Firyal's latest collection, Postcards from Mesopotamia, is inspired by her reaction to the tragic looting of the museum of Baghdad in 2003.

She has participated in both solo and group exhibitions, in London and in the Persian Gulf.

Work
She has written one novel, and has also published a book with a collection of her poetry and paintings. Much of her work is inspired by poetry. Her later paintings incorporates Arabic script, over which she has mastery demonstrates a sincerity to Arab civilization especially the Babylonian and Sumerian civilizations. Her artworks have inspired the poetry of several Arabic poets including Laoy Taha and Mahmoud Darwish.

Solo exhibitions 
 1988 – The Gallery, Intercontinental Hotel, Bahrain. Organized by the Ministry of Information
 1990 – Kufa Gallery, London, UK organized by Ross Issa
 1993-  The Artist  Studio, London, UK
 1997-  The Artist  Studio, London, UK
 2006-  Darlelbareh Gallery, Manama, Bahrain
 2008-  Green Art Gallery Dubai "Postcards from Mesopotamia"
 2009-  The Memory of the place Gallery " When the Word Turns into Fragrant Ray of Light " Manama Bahrain

Joint exhibitions 
 1987 – Bahrain Art Society Annual Exhibition, Bahrain
 1988 – Alfan Gallery, Bahrain
 1988 – Bahrain Art Society Annual Exhibition, Bahrain
 1989 – Print making annual Exhibition  London UK
 1991 – Iraqi Artist Society Exhibition at Gallery 4, London, UK
 1991 – Iraqi Artists at Kufa Gallery, London, UK
 1992 – Arab Women Artists by the General Union of Palestinian Women
 1992 – Iraqi Artist Society at Camden Town Lock, London, UK
 1992 – Iraqi Women's Festival of Culture, Kufa Gallery, London, UK
 1993 – Iraqi Artists Society at Gallery 4, London, UK
 1993 – Group of International Artists, London, UK. Organized by Eastern Art Report
 1993 – Group Exhibition, Imperial College, London, UK
 1994 – Group Exhibition, Aramco, Inmaa Gallery, Saudi Arabia
 1995 – Arab Fine Art Exhibition, London, UK. Organized by Arab-British Chambers of Commerce
 1995 – “The World’s Women On-line Electronic Ballet” - Internet exhibition at the UN conference, Beijing, China
 1995 – Arab Women Artists in London, Saidy Gallery, London, UK
 1996 – Women Artists of the Islamic World, Islington Museum Gallery, London, UK
 1997 – Group Exhibition at Saudi Arabian Art Gallery
 1998 – Working for hotels’ project in the Persian Gulf
 1998 – Group Exhibition “Selection from Arab Contemporary Art”, Bahrain
 2001 – “Dialogue of the present” Groups of 18 Arab women artists was toured exhibition from January 1999 to January 2001, covering Bath, Plymouth, London (SOAS, Brunei Gallery) and Brighton University, UK
 2008-09 Iraq Speaks to the Present, British Museum, UK 
 2009 - "Babylon Myth and Reality" British Museum London 2008-2009

See also

Islamic art
List of Iraqi artists
List of Iraqi women artists

Notes

References 

Living people
1950 births
Artists from Baghdad
British people of Iraqi descent
Iraqi women artists
British women artists
Iraqi emigrants to the United Kingdom